Hardy Run is a stream in the U.S. state of West Virginia.

Hardy Run bears the name of an early settler.

See also
List of rivers of West Virginia

References

Rivers of Monroe County, West Virginia
Rivers of West Virginia